is a Japanese mixed martial artist currently fighting at Welterweight. A longtime veteran of the Pancrase organization, Kunioku captured the King of Pancrase Middleweight Championship and King of Pancrase Welterweight Championship before leaving the organization in 2004 to compete in the K-1 HERO'S mixed martial arts organization. He holds notable victories over Frank Shamrock, Nate Marquardt, Masakatsu Funaki, and Genki Sudo.

Kunioku has fought in Pancrase on 55 different occasions. He has also competed in the Abu Dhabi Professional Submission Grappling Tournament in 2003, but did not place.

Kunioku was scheduled to face Vincent Latoel at Fury 2 on October 9, 2010 in Macau. However, Kunioku was later removed from the card and the event was cancelled entirely on October 7.

He replaced Leonardo Santos in a bout with Maximo Blanco at Sengoku Raiden Championship 15 on October 30, 2010. Kunioku lost the fight by KO late in the first round.

Background 
In 1992, at the same time as graduating from junior high school, he joined the professional wrestling Fujiwara group led by Yoshiaki Fujiwara and became a trainee. With the launch of Pancrase in 1993, Kunioku also belonged to Pancrase as a trainee. At that time, he worked under the name Kunioku Shoryu (國奥将竜).

Championships and accomplishments 
 Pancrase
King of Pancrase Middleweight Championship (One time)
King of Pancrase Welterweight Championship (One time)
 Fight Matrix
 Highest Quarterly Ranking: 7/01/2000, #1 Middleweight

Mixed martial arts record 

|-
| Loss
| align=center| 34–25–9
| Ramazan Esenbaev
| Decision (majority)
| IGF: Inoki Bom-Ba-Ye 2014
| 
| align=center| 3
| align=center| 5:00
| Tokyo, Japan
|
|-
| Loss
| align=center| 34–24–9
| Maximo Blanco
| KO (punches)
| World Victory Road Presents: Sengoku Raiden Championships 15
| 
| align=center| 1
| align=center| 4:26
| Tokyo, Japan
| 
|-
| Loss
| align=center| 34–23–9
| Leonardo Santos
| Submission (rear-naked choke)
| World Victory Road Presents: Sengoku Raiden Championships 12
| 
| align=center| 1
| align=center| 3:06
| Tokyo, Japan
| 
|-
| Win
| align=center| 34–22–9
| A Sol Kwon
| Decision (unanimous)
| World Victory Road Presents: Sengoku 5
| 
| align=center| 3
| align=center| 5:00
| Tokyo, Japan
| 
|-
| Win
| align=center| 33–22–9
| Jay Ellis
| Submission (toe hold)
| FCC 35: Freestyle Combat Challenge 35
| 
| align=center| 1
| align=center| 1:47
| Racine, Wisconsin, United States
| 
|-
| Win
| align=center| 32–22–9
| David Love
| TKO (punches)
| FCC 34: Freestyle Combat Challenge 34
| 
| align=center| 2
| align=center| N/A
| Kenosha, Wisconsin, United States
| 
|-
| Draw
| align=center| 31–22–9
| Seichi Ikemoto
| Draw
| Deep: 32 Impact
| 
| align=center| 2
| align=center| 5:00
| Tokyo, Japan
| 
|-
| Draw
| align=center| 31–22–8
| Jutaro Nakao
| Draw
| Deep: 30 Impact
| 
| align=center| 3
| align=center| 5:00
| Osaka, Japan
| 
|-
| Loss
| align=center| 31–22–7
| Fabricio Monteiro
| Submission (rear-naked choke)
| Deep: 27 Impact
| 
| align=center| 1
| align=center| 4:41
| Tokyo, Japan
| 
|-
| Loss
| align=center| 31–21–7
| Antonio McKee
| Decision (unanimous)
| Hero's 4
| 
| align=center| 2
| align=center| 5:00
| Tokyo, Japan
| 
|-
| Win
| align=center| 31–20–7
| Jung Hwan Cha
| Submission (rear-naked choke)
| Hero's 2005 in Seoul
| 
| align=center| 1
| align=center| 2:01
| Seoul, South Korea
| 
|-
| Loss
| align=center| 30–20–7
| Akira Kikuchi
| Decision (unanimous)
| Hero's 3
| 
| align=center| 3
| align=center| 5:00
| Tokyo, Japan
| 
|-
| Loss
| align=center| 30–19–7
| Rodrigo Gracie
| Decision (unanimous)
| Hero's 2
| 
| align=center| 2
| align=center| 5:00
| Tokyo, Japan
| 
|-
| Loss
| align=center| 30–18–7
| Izuru Takeuchi
| Decision (majority)
| Pancrase: Brave 4
| 
| align=center| 3
| align=center| 5:00
| Tokyo, Japan
| 
|-
| Loss
| align=center| 30–17–7
| Kazuo Misaki
| TKO (doctor stoppage)
| Pancrase: Brave 1
| 
| align=center| 2
| align=center| 1:31
| Tokyo, Japan
| 
|-
| Win
| align=center| 30–16–7
| Kenichi Serizawa
| Decision (unanimous)
| Pancrase - Hybrid 10
| 
| align=center| 3
| align=center| 5:00
| Tokyo, Japan
| 
|-
| Loss
| align=center| 29–16–7
| Crosley Gracie
| Decision (unanimous)
| Pancrase - 10th Anniversary Show
| 
| align=center| 2
| align=center| 5:00
| Tokyo, Japan
| 
|-
| Win
| align=center| 29–15–7
| Katsuomi Inagaki
| Submission (rear-naked choke)
| Pancrase - Hybrid 7
| 
| align=center| 1
| align=center| 4:10
| Osaka, Japan
| 
|-
| Win
| align=center| 28–15–7
| Hidetaka Monma
| Decision (unanimous)
| Pancrase - Hybrid 4
| 
| align=center| 2
| align=center| 5:00
| Tokyo, Japan
| 
|-
| Loss
| align=center| 27–15–7
| Nate Marquardt
| KO (flying knee)
| Pancrase: Spirit 9
| 
| align=center| 3
| align=center| 4:36
| Tokyo, Japan
| 
|-
| Win
| align=center| 27–14–7
| Hiroki Nagaoka
| Submission (rear-naked choke)
| Pancrase: 2002 Anniversary Show
| 
| align=center| 3
| align=center| 4:36
| Yokohama, Japan
| 
|-
| Win
| align=center| 26–14–7
| Takafumi Ito
| Submission (armbar)
| Pancrase: 2002 Neo-Blood Tournament Second Round
| 
| align=center| 1
| align=center| 4:59
| Tokyo, Japan
| 
|-
| Win
| align=center| 25–14–7
| Koji Oishi
| Decision (unanimous)
| Pancrase: 2002 Neo-Blood Tournament Opening Round
| 
| align=center| 3
| align=center| 5:00
| Tokyo, Japan
| 
|-
| Win
| align=center| 24–14–7
| Hideaki Iwasaki
| Decision (Unanimous)
| Pancrase: Spirit 5
| 
| align=center| 2
| align=center| 5:00
| Tokyo, Japan
| 
|-
| Win	
| align=center| 23–14–7
| Nate Marquardt
| Decision (majority)
| Pancrase: Proof 7
| 
| align=center| 3
| align=center| 5:00
| Yokohama, Japan
| 
|-
| Win
| align=center| 22–14–7
| Ryuki Ueyama
| Decision (majority)
| Pancrase: 2001 Anniversary Show
| 
| align=center| 2
| align=center| 5:00
| Yokohama, Japan
| 
|-
| Draw
| align=center| 21–14–7
| Sean Sherk
| Draw
| Pancrase: 2001 Neo-Blood Tournament Second Round
| 
| align=center| 3
| align=center| 5:00
| Tokyo, Japan
| 
|-
| Win
| align=center| 21–14–6
| Mathieu Nicourt
| Submission (kimura)
| Pancrase: Proof 4
| 
| align=center| 2
| align=center| 3:35
| Tokyo, Japan
| 
|-
| Win
| align=center| 20–14–6
| Daiju Takase
| Decision (majority)
| Pancrase: Proof 2
| 
| align=center| 3
| align=center| 5:00
| Kadoma, Osaka, Japan
| 
|-
| Draw
| align=center| 19–14–6
| Nate Marquardt
| Draw
| Pancrase: Trans 7
| 
| align=center| 1
| align=center| 20:00
| Tokyo, Japan
| 
|-
| Loss
| align=center| 19–14–5
| Nate Marquardt
| Decision (unanimous)
| Pancrase: 2000 Anniversary Show
| 
| align=center| 1
| align=center| 10:00
| Yokohama, Japan
| 
|-
| Win
| align=center| 19–13–5
| Matt Lee
| Submission (armbar)
| Pancrase: Trans 4
| 
| align=center| 1
| align=center| 4:15
| Tokyo, Japan
| 
|-
| Draw
| align=center| 18–13–5
| Shonie Carter
| Draw
| Pancrase: Trans 3
| 
| align=center| 2
| align=center| 3:00
| Yokohama, Japan
| 
|-
| Win
| align=center| 18–13–4
| Genki Sudo
| Decision (unanimous)
| Pancrase: Trans 2
| 
| align=center| 2
| align=center| 3:00
| Osaka, Japan
| 
|-
| Win
| align=center| 17–13–4
| Lane Andrews
| Submission (armbar)
| Pancrase: Breakthrough 11
| 
| align=center| 1
| align=center| 14:44
| Yokohama, Japan
| 
|-
| Loss
| align=center| 16–13–4
| Yuki Kondo
| KO (flying knee and palm strikes)
| Pancrase: 1999 Anniversary Show
| 
| align=center| 1
| align=center| 0:34
| Urayasu, Chiba, Japan
| 
|-
| Win
| align=center| 16–12–4
| Keiichiro Yamamiya
| Decision (lost points)
| Pancrase: Breakthrough 5
| 
| align=center| 1
| align=center| 15:00
| Nagoya, Aichi, Japan
| 
|-
| Win
| align=center| 15–12–4
| Yuki Kondo
| Decision (unanimous)
| Pancrase: Breakthrough 3
| 
| align=center| 1
| align=center| 15:00
| Tokyo, Japan
| 
|-
| Win
| align=center| 14–12–4
| Daisuke Watanabe
| Technical Submission (kimura)
| Pancrase: Breakthrough 2
| 
| align=center| 1
| align=center| 3:58
| Osaka, Japan
| 
|-
| Loss
| align=center| 13–12–4
| Jason DeLucia
| Decision (lost points)
| Pancrase: Breakthrough 1
| 
| align=center| 1
| align=center| 15:00
| Tokyo, Japan
| 
|-
| Win
| align=center| 13–11–4
| Daisuke Ishii
| Decision (unanimous)
| Pancrase: Advance 11
| 
| align=center| 1
| align=center| 10:00
| Osaka, Japan
| 
|-
| Win
| align=center| 12–11–4
| Masakatsu Funaki
| Decision (lost points)
| Pancrase: Advance 10
| 
| align=center| 1
| align=center| 15:00
| Tokyo, Japan
| 
|-
| Loss
| align=center| 11–11–4
| Evan Tanner
| Decision (lost points)
| Pancrase: 1998 Anniversary Show
| 
| align=center| 1
| align=center| 20:00
| Tokyo, Japan
| 
|-
| Loss
| align=center| 
| Leon van Dijk
| KO (head kick)
| Pancrase: Advance 7
| 
| align=center| 1
| align=center| 3:57
| Tokyo, Japan
| 
|-
| Loss
| align=center| 11–9–4
| Adrian Serrano
| Decision (majority)
| Pancrase: Advance 5
| 
| align=center| 2
| align=center| 3:00
| Yokohama, Japan
| 
|-
| Win
| align=center| 11–8–4
| Osami Shibuya
| Decision (majority)
| Pancrase: Advance 3
| 
| align=center| 1
| align=center| 20:00
| Kobe, Hyogo, Japan
| 
|-
| Draw
| align=center| 10–8–4
| Yuki Kondo
| Draw (majority)
| Pancrase: Advance 2
| 
| align=center| 2
| align=center| 3:00
| Yokohama, Japan
| 
|-
| Win
| align=center| 
| Kosei Kubota
| Submission (armbar)
| Pancrase: Advance 1
| 
| align=center| 1
| align=center| 7:52
| Tokyo, Japan
| 
|-
| Loss
| align=center| 9–8–3
| Jong Wang Kim
| Technical Submission (guillotine choke)
| Pancrase: Alive 11
| 
| align=center| 1
| align=center| 0:21
| Yokohama, Japan
| 
|-
| Loss
| align=center| 9–7–3
| Guy Mezger
| KO (head kick)
| Pancrase: Alive 9
| 
| align=center| 1
| align=center| 11:12
| Tokyo, Japan
| 
|-
| Win
| align=center| 9–6–3
| John Lober
| Decision (lost points)
| Pancrase: 1997 Anniversary Show
| 
| align=center| 1
| align=center| 10:00
| Urayasu, Chiba, Japan
| 
|-
| Win
| align=center| 8–6–3
| Satoshi Hasegawa
| Submission (toe hold)
| Pancrase: Alive 8
| 
| align=center| 1
| align=center| 9:07
| Osaka, Japan
| 
|-
| Loss
| align=center| 7–6–3
| Jason DeLucia
| TKO (doctor stoppage)
| Pancrase: Alive 6
| 
| align=center| 1
| align=center| 18:51
| Tokyo, Japan
| 
|-
| Draw
| align=center| 7–5–3
| Keiichiro Yamamiya
| Draw (majority)
| Pancrase: Alive 5
| 
| align=center| 1
| align=center| 10:00
| Kobe, Hyogo, Japan
| 
|-
| Loss
| align=center| 7–5–2
| Bas Rutten
| Decision (lost points)
| Pancrase: Alive 4
| 
| align=center| 1
| align=center| 15:00
| Urayasu, Chiba, Japan
| 
|-
| Win
| align=center| 7–4–2
| Haygar Chin
| Submission (armbar)
| Pancrase: Alive 3
| 
| align=center| 1
| align=center| 7:44
| Nagoya, Aichi, Japan
| 
|-
| Loss
| align=center| 6–4–2
| Yuki Kondo
| Decision (split)
| Pancrase: Alive 1
| 
| align=center| 1
| align=center| 20:00
| Tokyo, Japan
| 
|-
| Win
| align=center| 6–3–2
| Frank Shamrock
| Decision (unanimous)
| Pancrase: Truth 10
| 
| align=center| 1
| align=center| 20:00
| Tokyo, Japan
| 
|-
| Win
| align=center| 5–3–2
| Satoshi Hasegawa
| TKO (palm strikes)
| Pancrase: Truth 9
| 
| align=center| 1
| align=center| 6:32
| Kobe, Hyogo, Japan
| 
|-
| Win
| align=center| 4–3–2
| Keiichiro Yamamiya
| Submission (armbar)
| Pancrase: Truth 8
| 
| align=center| 1
| align=center| 1:38
| Tokyo, Japan
| 
|-
| Win
| align=center| 3–3–2
| Guy Mezger
| Decision (split)
| Pancrase: Truth 7
| 
| align=center| 1
| align=center| 10:00
| Nagoya, Aichi, Japan
| 
|-
| Loss
| align=center| 2–3–2
| Manabu Yamada
| Submission (guillotine choke)
| Pancrase: 1996 Anniversary Show
| 
| align=center| 1
| align=center| 8:29
| Chiba, Japan
| 
|-
| Loss
| align=center| 2–2–2
| Pete Williams
| Decision (unanimous)
| Pancrase: 1996 Neo-Blood Tournament, Round 1
| 
| align=center| 1
| align=center| 10:00
| Tokyo, Japan
| 
|-
| Win
| align=center| 2–1–2
| Takafumi Ito
| Decision (lost points)
| Pancrase: Truth 6
| 
| align=center| 1
| align=center| 10:00
| Fukuoka, Japan
| 
|-
| Draw
| align=center| 1–1–2
| Yuki Kondo
| Draw (majority)
| Pancrase: Truth 5
| 
| align=center| 1
| align=center| 10:00
| Tokyo, Japan
| 
|-
| Loss
| align=center| 1–1–1
| Jason DeLucia
| Decision (lost points)
| Pancrase: Truth 4
| 
| align=center| 1
| align=center| 15:00
| Tokyo, Japan
| 
|-
| Win
| align=center| 1–0–1
| Takafumi Ito
| TKO (palm strikes)
| Pancrase: Truth 2
| 
| align=center| 1
| align=center| 0:54
| Kobe, Hyogo, Japan
| 
|-
| Draw
| align=center| 0–0–1
| Osami Shibuya
| Draw (split)
| Pancrase: Truth 1
| 
| align=center| 1
| align=center| 10:00
| Yokohama, Japan
|

Submission grappling record
KO PUNCHES
|- style="text-align:center; background:#f0f0f0;"
| style="border-style:none none solid solid; "|Result
| style="border-style:none none solid solid; "|Opponent
| style="border-style:none none solid solid; "|Method
| style="border-style:none none solid solid; "|Event
| style="border-style:none none solid solid; "|Date
| style="border-style:none none solid solid; "|Round
| style="border-style:none none solid solid; "|Time
| style="border-style:none none solid solid; "|Notes
|-
|Loss|| Marcelo García || || ADCC 2003 –77 kg|| 2003|| 1|| ||
|-

See also
List of male mixed martial artists

References

External links

1976 births
Living people
Japanese male mixed martial artists
Welterweight mixed martial artists
Sportspeople from Osaka